Juba is the capital of South Sudan.

Juba may also refer to:

Locations 
 Juba, Estonia, a village in Võru Parish, Võru County, Estonia
 Jubaland, Somalia
 Jubba River, Somalia

People 
Ancient
 Juba I of Numidia, King (85 BC–46 BC)
 Juba II, client King of Numidia and Mauretania (52 BC–AD 23)
 Juba of Mauretania (2nd century writer)
 Titus Desticius Juba (3rd century Roman governor)

Modern
 Stephen Juba (1914–1993), mayor of the city of Winnipeg, Manitoba, Canada from 1957 to 1977
 Master Juba (1825–1852), stage name for William Henry Lane
 Jussi Tuomola (born 1965), Finnish cartoonist with the pen name Juba
 Juba (sniper), a nickname associated with a supposed sniper involved with the Iraqi insurgency
 Juba Kalamka (born 1970), African American bisexual artist and activist

Other 
 Juba Arabic
 Juba dance
 Juba skipper (Hesperia juba), a butterfly
 "Juba", a song by DJ Spooky from the album Songs of a Dead Dreamer
 Juba (food), a New World slave food
 Juba, the Latin name of the star Gamma Leonis
 Alternate spelling of the jubba, a type of garment

See also
 Joba (disambiguation)
 Yuba (disambiguation)